is a Japanese manga series by Kana Ozawa. It was serialized in Shinchosha's seinen manga magazine Monthly Comic @ Bunch between April 2015 and November 2017 and was collected in five tankōbon volumes. A prequel manga by Ozawa titled  has been serialized online via Line Corporation's Line Manga website between November 2021 and January 2022 and was collected in a single tankōbon volume by Shinchosha. An anime film adaptation by Telecom Animation Film opened in Japan in March 2022.

Characters

Media

Manga

Volume list

Blue Thermal: First Flight

Film
An anime film adaptation by Telecom Animation Film opened in Japan on March 4, 2022. Masaki Tachibana is directing the film, as well as writing the film's scripts alongside Natsuko Takahashi. The character designs were provided by Miho Tanino, while the music was composed by Shōgo Kaida. Four-member piano rock band SHE'S performed the film's titular theme song "Blue Thermal" and the insert song "Beautiful Bird". During their Anime NYC panel, Eleven Arts licensed the film for North America release.

References

External links
  
  
 

Aviation comics
Japanese webcomics
Seinen manga
Shinchosha manga
TMS Entertainment
Webcomics in print